The 1953 Wellington City mayoral election was part of the New Zealand local elections held that same year. In 1953, elections were held for the Mayor of Wellington plus other local government positions including fifteen city councillors. The polling was conducted using the standard first-past-the-post electoral method.

Campaign
The mayoral contest was essentially a rematch from three years previously with incumbent mayor Robert Macalister opposed by councillor Frank Kitts of the Labour Party. A third candidate, Julius Hyde, stood as an independent campaigning on his opposition to the construction of an international airport in Wellington.

A major talking point in the lead up to the election was the potential of a clash with the 1953 Royal Tour. There were proposals to postpone local elections until early 1954 over fears of reduced turnout due to a conflicted schedule. The proposals were considered by the Minister of Internal Affairs William Bodkin, who ultimately decided against it.

Mayoralty results

Councillor results

 
 
 
 
 
 
 
 
 
 
 
 
 
 
 
 
 
 
 
 
 
 

  
 
  
 
 
 
 
 
 
 
 
 
 
 
 
 
 
 
 
 
 
 

Table footnotes:
<noinclude>

References

Mayoral elections in Wellington
1953 elections in New Zealand
Politics of the Wellington Region
1950s in Wellington
October 1953 events in New Zealand